Valla Desam is a 2017 Indian Tamil-language action film written and directed by N. T. Nantha. The film stars Anu Hasan, with Nassar, Amit, David Yuvarajan and Akarshana portraying supporting characters. The film began production in early 2012 and had a theatrical release after several delays on 22 September 2017.

Cast
Anu Hasan as Anu
Nassar
Bala Singh
V. I. S. Jayapalan
Amit Tiwari
David Yuvarajan as David
Akarshana as Anjali
Andrei Lenart as Andrei Blok
Rory Locke as Alex Dela
Kumud Pant as CID Officer

Production
Anu Hasan first announced the project during an interview to The Hindu in May 2012, stating she had signed on to appear in a film titled Kanavughal Aayiram to be directed by London-based film maker Nantha Thurai. The film began shoot in London during late 2012 under the title of Aayiram Kanavugal and was also developed under its literal English translation 1000 Dreams, before undergoing a name change in late 2014 after a period of little progress. In July 2015, actor Silambarasan recorded his voice for a song in the film, which has music composed by his cousin, Muthukumarasamy who is also the son of veteran composer late L. Vaidyanathan. The film's soundtrack album and trailer was released at an event in Chennai in August 2015 by actor Kamal Haasan and director Bharathiraja. Following two years of inactivity, the team prepared the film for a theatrical release in September 2017.

Soundtrack

The film's music was composed by L. V. Muthukumarasamy and R. K. Sundar, while the audio rights of the film were acquired by Junglee Music. The album was released on 3 August 2015 and featured five songs.

Release
The film was released across Tamil Nadu on 22 September 2017 during the most crowded release date of the year at the Chennai box office. The film drew largely negative reviews, with a critic from Sify.com writing that the film has "bad writing and amateurish making" and "ends up as a tedious watch mainly due to the bland writing". The critic added the film has "the potential for an edge of the seat action thriller but sadly the problem is that it literally offers nothing new and execution is below average". A critic from the Deccan Chronicle wrote "the problems of Valla Desam start early and despite having a lot of the elements required for a successful spy thriller in place, the dialogues and the characterization fall flat, and because of this, none of the personal tragedy and dangers tends to strike you as imminent. Likewise, a reviewer from The Times of India noted "Valla Desam aspires to be a tense spy thriller, but falls short in both the writing and making." Baradwaj Rangan of Film Companion wrote "It’s a great idea to bring the Vijayashanti brand of action-heroine back to the Tamil screen, but you have to make us invest in her as a person first. Anu’s family scenes are painfully perfunctory."

References

External links

2017 films
2010s Tamil-language films
Indian spy action films
Indian action thriller films
Films set in London
Films shot in London
2010s spy action films
2017 action thriller films